Josephine Clofullia (1829–1870) was a famous Swiss-born bearded lady who toured with P. T. Barnum's "American Museum".

Early life
Madame Clofullia, as she was often billed, was born Josephine Boisdechêne in Versoix, Switzerland. She was born hairy and reputedly had a two-inch beard at the age of eight. At the age of fourteen she began to tour Europe, first accompanied by her father and an agent and then with her father alone. In Paris she met painter Fortune Clofullia and eventually married him. She is notorious for fashioning her beard to imitate that of Napoleon III. In return, the ruler gave her a large diamond.

Personal life
Josephine gave birth to two children; the first, a daughter who was born in 1851, died in infancy. Her son Albert, who was born the next year, was as hirsute as his mother had been.

Sideshow career
All four — Clofullia, her husband, son and father — moved to the United States where they joined forces with P. T. Barnum. Barnum had her beard officially measured as 6 inches, gave Albert a new name — "Infant Esau", after the biblical character — and took them to his American Museum.

Law suit
In July 1853 William Charr took Clofullia to court, claiming that she was actually a man and an impostor. During the case doctors examined her and verified that she was a female and the case was eventually dismissed. By hearsay it has been suspected that Barnum arranged the whole matter himself as a publicity stunt.

Later life and death
In 1870 she was being exhibited at St. Matthews Fair in the town of Bridgwater, England. In late September, Josephine became ill and whilst recovering in the Bridgwater Workhouse Hospital, she died. Her cause of death being listed on the death certificate as a "low fever." She is buried in the paupers section of Wembdon Road Cemetery, Bridgwater.

References

Bearded women
1827 births
1870 deaths
Swiss performance artists
Swiss emigrants to the United States